The National Sports Awards is the collective name given to the six sports awards of Republic of India. It is awarded annually by the Ministry of Youth Affairs and Sports. They are presented by the President of India in the same ceremony at the Rashtrapati Bhavan usually on 29th August each year along with the national adventure award. , a total of fifty-nine individuals have been awarded the various National Sports Awards in shooting. The four awards presented in shooting are Major Dhyan Chand Khel Ratna, Arjuna Award, Dhyan Chand Award and Dronacharya Award.

First presented in the year 1961, a total of forty-eight individuals have been honoured with the Arjuna Award in shooting for their "good performance at the international level" over the period of last four years, with one individual being awarded for their lifetime contribution. First presented in the year 2001, a total of three coaches have been honoured with the Dronacharya Award in shooting for their "outstanding work on a consistent basis and enabling sportspersons to excel in international events" over the period of last four years, with one coach being awarded in the lifetime contribution category. First presented in the year 2001, a total of eight sportspersons have been honoured with the Rajiv Gandhi Khel Ratna, the highest sporting honour of India, in shooting for their "most outstanding performance at the international level" over the period of last four years.

Recipients

Reference

External links
Official Website

Indian sports trophies and awards
Ministry of Youth Affairs and Sports